The Constitution of Mauritius mentions no official language. It only contains a statement in Article 49 that "The official language of the Assembly shall be English but any member may address the chair in French" implying that English and French are official languages of the National Assembly (parliament). It is only in the Parliament that the official language is English but any member of the National Assembly can still address the chair in French. English and French are generally accepted as the official languages of Mauritius and as the languages of government administration and the court business, while the lingua franca is Creole.

English is used as the prime medium of instruction in public schools while French is also a common language in education and the dominant language of media. According to the Organisation internationale de la Francophonie, 72.7% of the Mauritians were French speakers in 2005. Mauritius shares this distinction of being both English- and French-speaking with Canada, Cameroon, Dominica, Rwanda, Seychelles and Vanuatu. Being both an English-speaking and French-speaking nation, Mauritius is a member of both the Commonwealth of Nations and La Francophonie.

The majority language and lingua franca of the country is the French-based Mauritian Creole, spoken at home by 86.5% of the population. Bhojpuri is still spoken among the third generations the second most spoken language in Mauritius, but its usage is decreasing. Mauritian Creole, which is spoken by an estimated 90% of the population, is considered to be the native language of the country and is used most often in informal settings. It was developed in the 18th century by slaves who used a pidgin language to communicate with each other as well as with their French masters, who did not understand the various African languages. The pidgin evolved with later generations to become a casual language. Mauritian Creole is a French-based creole due to its close ties with French pronunciation and vocabulary.

Other languages spoken in Mauritius mainly include Bhojpuri, Tamil, Telugu, Hindi-Urdu, and Chinese. Most Mauritians are at least bilingual, if not trilingual or quadrilingual. The earliest builders brought by the French were of Indian origin, who were employed to build Port Louis, the capital. Arabic is taught in mosques around Mauritius. Mauritian Sign Language is the language of the deaf community.

See also 
Demographics of Mauritius
African English
African French
Linguistic variety in Mauritius

References

External links 
Linguistic situation in Mauritius